Márcio Richardes de Andrade (born 30 November 1981) is a Brazilian midfielder. He is currently a free agent.

Career
Márcio Richardes played for Criciúma and São Caetano in the Campeonato Brasileiro. He has also played for Alberex Niigata and Urawa Red Diamonds in the J1 League. In 2010, Richardes became the first known player to score a perfect hat-trick of set pieces: successfully converting a free kick, corner kick, and penalty in the same game.

Club statistics

1Includes Emperor's Cup.
2Includes J. League Cup.

Honors and awards

Individual
J. League Best Eleven: 1
 2010

References

External links

Márcio Richardes at Urawa Red Diamonds official site 
Márcio Richardes at Yahoo! Japan sports 

1981 births
Living people
Brazilian footballers
Brazilian expatriate footballers
Coritiba Foot Ball Club players
União São João Esporte Clube players
Criciúma Esporte Clube players
Associação Desportiva São Caetano players
Marília Atlético Clube players
Expatriate footballers in Japan
J1 League players
Albirex Niigata players
Urawa Red Diamonds players
Association football midfielders
People from Andradina